Zodarion scutatum is a spider species found in Slovenia and Croatia.

See also 
 List of Zodariidae species

References

External links 

scutatum
Spiders of Europe
Spiders described in 1980